An ultra-cool dwarf is a stellar or sub-stellar object of spectral class M that has an effective temperature lower than .
This category of dwarf stars was introduced in 1997 by J. Davy Kirkpatrick, Todd J. Henry, and Michael J. Irwin. It originally included very low mass M-dwarf stars with spectral types of M7 but was later expanded to encompass stars ranging from the coldest known to brown dwarfs as cool as spectral type T6.5. Altogether, ultra-cool dwarves represent about 15% of the astronomical objects in the stellar neighborhood of the Sun. One of the best known examples is TRAPPIST-1.

Models of the formation of planets suggest that due to their low masses and the small size of their proto-planetary disks, these stars could host a relatively abundant population of terrestrial Earth-like planets ranging from Mercury-sized to Earth-sized bodies,  rather than a population of super-Earths and Jupiter-massed planets. The discovery of the TRAPPIST-1 planetary system, consisting of seven Earth-like planets, would appear to validate this accretion model.

Due to their slow hydrogen fusion, when compared to other types of low-mass stars the life spans of ultra-cool dwarves are estimated to be at least several hundred billion years, with the smallest among them living for about 12 trillion years. As the age of the universe is only 13.8 billion years, all ultra-cool dwarf stars are therefore relatively young. Models predict that at the ends of their lives the smallest of these stars will become blue dwarfs rather than expanding into red giants.

Magnetic properties
After the detection of bursts of radio emission from the M9 ultracool dwarf LP  in 2001, a number of astrophysicists began observation campaigns at the Arecibo Observatory and the Very Large Array to search for additional objects emitting radio waves. To date hundreds of ultra-cool dwarves have been observed with these radio telescopes and of these stars, more than a dozen radio-emitting ultra-cool dwarves have been identified. These surveys indicate that approximately 5-10% of ultracool dwarves emit radio waves. These observation campaigns identified the noteworthy 2MASS J10475385+2124234, which has a temperature of 800-900 K making it the coolest known radio-emitting brown dwarf. 2MASS J10475385+2124234 is a T6.5 brown dwarf that retains a magnetic field with a strength greater than 1.7 kG, making it some 3000 times more intense than Earth's magnetic field.

References 

+